= House of Leshukov =

Building in Taganrog, Rostov, Russia

- Дом Лешуковой
- Interactive map of the House of Leshukov area

General information
- Location: Taganrog, Komsomolsky Boulevard, 37
- Coordinates: 47°12′29″N 38°56′45″E

The House of Leshukov (Russian: Дом Лешуковой) is a building at 37 Komsomolsky Boulevard in Taganrog, Rostov Oblast.

== History and description ==
In the 1860s, Baron Karl Reinking appeared the owner of the house. Roman and subject Pyotr de Rossi was the following owner of the house. They with the wife Theresa Nikolaevna brought up the daughter Maria who was born in 1873. Rossi's family was on friendly terms with the merchant Baklazhoglo and his family, were Godfathers to their children – to Nikolay and Maria. Pyotr Yakovlevich Rossi's father – Jakov Petrovich Rossi was the Italian vice-consul, his brother Victor Yakovlevich de Rossi in 1872 became engaged to the Azov bourgeois Ulyana Andreevna Andropova.

From 1873 to 1880, the house belonged to the petty bourgeois Konstantin Kuzminov. In the middle of the 1880s (according to other data – in 1890) the stabs-captain's spouse Vera Soltanova began to own the house. From 1898 to 1906 the house was in the property of the nobleman Alexander Ivanovich Korobyin. In 1915 the house was owned by the widow Elizabeth Leshukova.

The corner one-story house was built in style of the Russian provincial classicism with the plastered walls. Croutons are located on the crowning eaves. Sideways on the first floor, there are four windows, on the area of the central facade – windows with an arch segmentary entrance which decorate sandrikam on arms. Squared pair pilasters with a Doric capital are placed on subwindow eaves, the decorated ornament. They divide a facade into three parts of the different size. The main entrance is created with a shod umbrella, placed between pilasters on the right. Under it, the ornament from rectangular small niches contains.
